Kham Thale So is a district (amphoe) of Nakhon Ratchasima province, northeastern Thailand.

History
The government separated some parts of Non Thai and Sung Noen districts and created the minor district (king amphoe) Kham Thale So in 1958, which was upgraded to a full district in 1965.

Geography
Neighbouring districts are (from the north clockwise) Non Thai, Mueang Nakhon Ratchasima, Sung Noen, and Dan Khun Thot.

Administration
The district is divided into five sub-districts (tambons). Kham Thale So is also a township (thesaban tambon) which covers parts of the tambon Kham Thale So.

Economy
The district is the site of salt mines operated by the Saltworks Company, a major producer of salt for the chemical and food industries.

References

Kham Thale So